There are a number of movements known as the Islamic Renaissance Party:

 Islamic Renaissance Party of Tajikistan
 Islamic Renaissance Party (Uzbekistan)
 Islamic Renaissance Party (Russia), existed from 1990 to 1994